William Quincy Porter (February 7, 1897 – November 12, 1966) was an American composer and teacher of classical music.

Biography
Born in New Haven, Connecticut, he went to Yale University where his teachers included Horatio Parker and David Stanley Smith. Porter received two awards while studying music at Yale: the Osborne Prize for Fugue, and the Steinert Prize for orchestral composition. He performed the winning composition, a violin concerto, at graduation. Porter earned two degrees at Yale, an A.B. from Yale College and a Mus. B from the music school.

After graduation, he spent a year in Paris, studying at Schola Cantorum, then went to New York where he studied with Ernest Bloch and Vincent d'Indy. In 1923 Porter joined the faculty of the Cleveland Institute of Music where he was later appointed head of the Theory Department. He remained there until 1928 when he resigned to focus on composition. Returning to Paris on a Guggenheim Fellowship Porter began composing in earnest. During his 3 years in Paris, he composed Blues Lointains (1928), the Suite for Viola Alone (1930), his 3rd String Quartet (1930), 4th String Quartet (1931), his 2nd Violin Sonata (1929), and his Piano Sonata (1930). During the first trip, his daughter, Helen, was born.

In 1931 Porter returned to the United States, first rejoining the faculty at the Cleveland Institute of Music, then teaching at Vassar, where he was appointed a professor in 1932. In 1954, Porter's 1953 Concerto Concertante, a concerto for two pianos and orchestra, was awarded the Pulitzer Prize for Music. Music historian Nicholas Tawa calls the piece, "affectively compelling, orchestrally luminous, and contrapuntally active"; cooperative rather than competitive. In 1938 later Porter became dean (1938–42) and then director (1942–46) of the New England Conservatory of Music, and in 1946 returned to Yale, as professor, to teach until 1965. Porter also served, from 1958 until his death, as chairman of the board of directors of the American Music Center, which he had founded with Howard Hanson and Aaron Copland in 1939. He died in Bethany, Connecticut.

He wrote a substantial amount in the "absolute (established) forms", including nine string quartets (1923–1953), several concertos (including one for harpsichord, one for viola, and one for two pianos, the latter work receiving the 1954 Pulitzer Prize for Music), and two symphonies.  His later music—while tonal—is harmonically acerbic and dissonant. His work was also part of the music event in the art competition at the 1936 Summer Olympics.

Selected works
Symphonies
Symphony no. 1, 1934
Symphony no. 2, 1962
Other orchestral
Ukrainian Suite, 1925
Poem and Dance, 1932
Dance in Three-Time, 1937
Music for Strings, 1941
New England Episodes, 1958
Concertos
Concerto Concertante, for two pianos and orchestra, 1953
Harpsichord Concerto, 1959
Viola Concerto, 1948
Fantasy on a Pastoral Theme for organ and strings, 1943
Concerto for Wind Orchestra, 1959
Chamber music
Nine string quartets from 1922–23 (no. 1 in E minor), 1925, 1930, 1931, 1935, 1937, 1943, 1950, 1958
Piano Quintet, 1927
Quintet for harpsichord and strings, 1961
Oboe quintet (Elegiac), 1966
Little Trio (Suite in E Major) for flute, violin, and viola, 1928
Clarinet quintet, 1929
Two violin sonatas (1926, 1929; second recorded in the 1950s and more recently, 1st given its premiere recording in the late 1990s) (also an early sonata from 1919 has been recorded)
Suite for viola alone, 1930
Piano Sonata (1930)
Sonata for horn and piano, 1946
Sextet on a Slavic Folk-Theme, 1947
Blues Lointains for flute and piano (1928)

Books
Porter, Quincy. A Study of Sixteenth Century Counterpoint; Based on the Works of Orlando di Lasso. Boston: Loomis. 3rd ed. 1948.
Porter, Quincy.  A Study of Fugue Writing; Based on Bach's Well-tempered Clavichord. Boston: Loomis. 1951.

See also
Camp Ossipee, Porter's summer camp in Holderness, New Hampshire

Notes

References
Tawa, Nicholas E. (2001) . UPNE. . pp. 318–22.

External links

General Reference
The Quincy Porter papers at the Irving S. Gilmore Music Library, Yale University
Biography at the New England Conservatory
Biography There has been a recording released of the 7th quartet since this was written in 1999. 
Notes to the recording on New World of Porter's Dance in Three Time

Recordings
Quincy Porter: The Complete Viola Works, Eliesha Nelson, viola with Douglas Rioth, harp and John McLaughlin Williams, conductor, piano/harpsichord, violin (2009)
Quincy Porter: String Quartets 1 – 4, Ives Quartet (2007)
Quincy Porter: Complete String Quartets, Potomac String Quartet; Steven Honigberg, cello; George Marsh, violin; Sally McLain, violin; Tsuna Sakamoto, viola (2007)
Quincy Porter: Symphony No. 1: Poem & Dance; Symphony No. 2, Sinfonia Varsovia; Ian Hobson, conductor (2003)
 Robert Ward: Festive Ode; Prairie Overture; Sacred Songs for Pantheists; Quincy Porter: New England Episodes, Conductors: William Strickland, Zdzislav Szostak; performer: Sylvia Stahlman
American Music for Two Pianos and Orchestra, Composers: Morton Gould, Walter Piston, Quincy Porter; Conductor, David Amos; Artists: Royal Philharmonic Orchestra, Joshua Pierce, Dorothy Jonas (1999)
Quincy Porter: The Unpublished Manuscripts for Violin & Piano, Quincy Porter, John Owings, and Fritz Gearhart (1998)
Ernest Bloch: Concerti Grossi 1 & 2/ Quincy Porter: Ukrainian Suite, Ernest Bloch, Quincy Porter, Donald Barra, and San Diego Chamber Orchestra (1994)
 Violin Sonatas: Copland, Piston, Porter; Linda Rosenthal, violin with Lisa Bergman, piano (1993)
American Chamber Music by Diamond, Chamber Music Society of Lincoln Center, David Schifrin, Hermann Ives, Bernard Herrmann, Quincy Porter, and Charles Ives (1992)
Carter Ives Porter Boston Symphony Chamber Players American Chamber Music 20th Century, Deutsche Grammophon – 2530 104 (1971)

1897 births
1966 deaths
American male classical composers
American classical composers
20th-century classical composers
Pulitzer Prize for Music winners
Pupils of Ernest Bloch
Pupils of Horatio Parker
Cleveland Institute of Music faculty
Vassar College faculty
New England Conservatory faculty
Schola Cantorum de Paris alumni
Musicians from New Haven, Connecticut
People from Bethany, Connecticut
20th-century American composers
20th-century American male musicians
Olympic competitors in art competitions